Bernhard von Mallinckrodt (29 November 1591 in Ahlen — 7 March 1664, Burg Ottenstein), dean (Domdechant) of Münster Cathedral, was a bibliophile from a noble family of Protestants, who converted to Catholicism.

In 1639 he issued a pamphlet at Cologne to mark the bicentenary of the invention of printing by moveable type in Europe, defending the priority of Gutenberg; it was titled  ("Of the rise and progress of the typographic art"), that includes the phrase , "the first infancy of printing". This gave rise to the term incunabula, which is still used to describe books and broadsheets printed before 1500, the arbitrary cut-off date selected by Mallinckrodt.

Notes

External links

1591 births
1664 deaths
German scholars
Bibliophiles